Mark A. Finley (born 1945) is the former host and director of It Is Written (from 1991–2004), for which he traveled around the world as a televangelist.  He was the first Seventh-day Adventist pastor to do a satellite evangelistic series.
He also served as one vice-president out of nine for the Seventh-day Adventist Church, and has written over 74 published books.

During his lifetime, Finley presented more than 150 evangelistic meeting series in over 70 countries, making him a key figure in Evangelism. He was also a television speaker for the series Experience Hope, a weekly broadcast of the Hope Channel, and was televised a further time in 2008, as a speaker for the annual North American NET series.

Finley has preached 17 NET series, broadcast throughout the world and written more than 70 books. He  presented seminar presentations, teaching manuals and writing magazine articles. He also writes a series of Bible studies published monthly in Adventist World.

Finley and his wife, Ernestine “Teenie,” have three children.

Finley's parents, James and Gloria Finley, started and managed two businesses through the years: Finley Screw Machine Products and James Wright Industries. Finley has three younger .

Books
2000 and Beyond
End Time Living
The Next Superpower
Satisfied
Solid Ground
Studying Together
Thirteen Life-Changing Secrets
Revelation's Predictions for a New Millennium

Books co-authored with Steven R. Mosley:
A Religion that Works
Confidence Amid Chaos
Faith Against the Odds
Jerusalem Showdown
Hope for a New Century
Looking for God in all the Wrong Places
Questioning the Supernatural
Revelation's Three Most Wanted
Unshakable Faith
When Faith Crumbles
Why So Many Denominations?

Books co-authored with George Vandeman, the founder of It Is Written:
The Overcomers

See also

Seventh-day Adventist Church
General Conference of Seventh-day Adventists
It Is Written

References

External links
, in a message to the General Youth Conference in 2004
"Finding God Through Net '96", gratitude expressed by Jeff Teater
Articles about Finley and by Finley, as cataloged in the Seventh-day Adventist Periodical Index (SDAPI)
http://www.adventist.org web site of the Seventh-day Adventist Church

1945 births
Living people
American religious writers
Christian writers
Seventh-day Adventist religious workers
American television evangelists
American Seventh-day Adventists
Place of birth missing (living people)